The Battle of Scheveningen (also known as the Battle of Ter Heijde) was the final naval battle of the First Anglo-Dutch War. It took place on 31 July 1653 (10 August on the Gregorian calendar), between the fleets of the Commonwealth of England and the United Provinces. The Dutch fleet suffered massive losses but achieved its immediate strategic goal of raising the Royal Navy blockade of the Dutch coast.

Background
After their victory at the Battle of the Gabbard in June 1653, the English fleet of 120 ships under General at Sea George Monck on his flagship Resolution blockaded the Dutch coast, capturing many merchant vessels. The Dutch economy began to collapse, with mass unemployment and a severe economic downturn affecting it. On 24 July (3 August on the Gregorian calendar), the Dutch Lieutenant-Admiral Maarten Tromp put to sea in Brederode with a fleet of 100 ships, to lift the blockade at the island of Texel, where Vice-Admiral Witte de With's 27 ships were blockaded by the English. Five days later, the English sighted Tromp and pursued to the south, sinking two Dutch ships before dark but allowing De With to slip out and rendezvous the next day with Tromp off Scheveningen, right next to the small village of Ter Heijde, after Tromp had positioned himself by some brilliant maneuvering to the north of the English fleet.

Battle
The winds were fierce on 30 July and overnight, giving both fleets pause.  Around 7:00 a.m. on 31 July, the Dutch gained an advantage from the weather and attacked, led by Brederode.  The fleets moved through each other four times. Tromp was killed early in the fight by a sharpshooter in the rigging of Sir William Penn's ship.  His death was kept secret to keep up the morale of the Dutch but by late afternoon, twelve of their ships had either been sunk or captured and many were too damaged to continue the fight. In the end, morale broke and a large group of vessels under the command of merchant captains fled to the north. De With tried to halt their flight but had to limit himself to covering the retreat to the island of Texel. The English fleet was also badly damaged and with many wounded in urgent need of treatment, returned to port to refit and were unable to maintain the blockade.

Aftermath

Both sides claimed a victory: the English because of their tactical superiority, the Dutch because the strategic goal of their attack, the lifting of the blockade, had been achieved. However, Tromp's death was a severe blow to the Dutch – few now expected to beat the English; the Orangist faction lost political influence and Grand Pensionary Johan de Witt was willing to give formal treaty assurances to Cromwell that the infant William III of Orange would never become stadtholder, thus turning the Netherlands into a base for a Stuart restoration. Peace negotiations began in earnest, leading to the 1654 Treaty of Westminster.

The damage done to the Dutch fleet effectively ended the first war.

Notes

Explanatory notes

Citations

General references 
 
 
 

1653 in Europe
Conflicts in 1653
Scheveningen
George Monck, 1st Duke of Albemarle
Military history of the North Sea